Canicosa de la Sierra is a municipality located in the province of Burgos, Castile and León, Spain. According to the 2004 census (INE), the municipality has a population of 575 inhabitants.

References

External links
Canicosa.es

Municipalities in the Province of Burgos